Gniezno Voivodeship (Polish: Województwo Gnieźnieńskie, Latin: Palatinatus Gnesnensis) was a unit of administrative division and local government in Poland for a short time from 1768, when it was cut from the Kalisz Voivodeship, to the Second Partition of Poland in 1793. It was part of Greater Polish prowincja.

Greater Poland general governor (Starosta Generalny) seat:
 Poznań

Voivodeship governor (wojewoda) seat:
 Gniezno

General council (Sejmik Generalny) for the Greater Poland seat:
 Koło

Administrative division:
 Gniezno County (Powiat Gnieźnieński), Gniezno
 Kcynia County (Powiat Kcyński), Kcynia
 Naklo County (Powiat Nakielski), Nakło

Neighbouring Voivodeships:
 Pomeranian Voivodeship
 Inowrocław Voivodeship
 Brześć Kujawski Voivodeship
 Kalisz Voivodeship
 Poznań Voivodeship

Voivodeships of the Polish–Lithuanian Commonwealth
Former administrative regions of Greater Poland
1768 establishments in the Polish–Lithuanian Commonwealth
1793 disestablishments in the Polish–Lithuanian Commonwealth